Eburia patruelis is a species of beetle in the family Cerambycidae. It lives in Northern Mexico and was named in 1884.

References

Eburia